Rawya Saud Al Busaidi is the first Omani woman to be appointed to a ministerial portfolio. Al Busaidi has been Oman's Minister of Higher Education since 8 March 2004, and she is the president of the council of Sultan Qaboos University. She obtained a PhD from Oxford University.

Before her appointment as Higher Education Minister, she held the position of higher education undersecretary. She has made great improvements with the state of education in Oman.

References

Al Said dynasty
Alumni of the University of Oxford
Living people
Government ministers of Oman
Higher education ministers
Women government ministers of Oman
21st-century Omani women politicians
21st-century Omani politicians
Year of birth missing (living people)